Now and Forever is a Philippine television drama series broadcast by GMA Network. It premiered on March 14, 2005 on the network's Dramarama sa Hapon line up with Mukha as the first instalment. The series concluded on November 24, 2006 with Dangal as the seventh and final instalment.

Seasons
 Mukha (March 14, 2005 – June 10, 2005)
 Ganti (June 13, 2005 – October 21, 2005)
 Agos (October 24, 2005 – January 6, 2006)
 Tinig (January 9, 2006 – April 12, 2006)
 Duyan (April 17, 2006 – July 21, 2006)
 Linlang (July 24, 2006 – September 22, 2006)
 Dangal (September 25, 2006 – November 24, 2006)

Accolades

References

External links
 

2005 Philippine television series debuts
2006 Philippine television series endings
Filipino-language television shows
GMA Network drama series